The 1992–93 Purdue Boilermakers men's basketball team represented Purdue University during the 1992–93 college basketball season. Led by head coach Gene Keady, the Boilermakers were selected as the No. 9 seed in the Southeast Region of the NCAA tournament, but were defeated in the first round by Rhode Island, finishing the season with a 18–10 record (9–9 Big Ten).

Roster

Schedule and results

|-
!colspan=6 style=| Non-conference regular season

|-
!colspan=6 style=| Big Ten Regular Season

|-
!colspan=6 style=| NCAA Tournament

Rankings

References

Purdue Boilermarkers
Purdue
Purdue Boilermakers men's basketball seasons